Crossbow is a 2007 Australian coming-of-age drama film written and directed by David Michôd. The film features Cy Standen, Joel Edgerton, Lisa Chappell and Mirrah Foulkes and had its world premiere in competition at the Venice Film Festival on 9 March 2007. After that, the film competed at a number of film festivals and earned good reviews.

Plot 
The film focuses on a kid and his relationship with his mum and dad, his problems and struggles, and the neighbour who watches the whole thing unravel.

Cast
Cy Standen as The kid
Joel Edgerton as The dad
Lisa Chappell as The mum
Mirrah Foulkes as The Cop
David Michôd as Narrator

Filming
Filming took place at Macquarie Fields, Sydney, New South Wales, Australia.

Reception

Critical response
The film received mainly positive reviews. Jason Sondhi of short of the week gave film the positive review and praised Michôd's direction and said "I find the elegaic streak that Crossbow mines to be rare and wonderful in film, and kudos go to Michôd, because it is difficult to pull off. Indeed the film is strikingly reminiscent to one of the best films of this vein, Sofia Coppola’s work, The Virgin Suicides, a movie structured very similarly, with its title that undermines suspense, and its observant narration that wrestles with the exquisite sadness of seemingly senseless tragedy, and how it relates to sexuality and nostalgia."  Another review for the film also praised Michôd by saying "Michôd seems very close to hitting all the right notes in Crossbow and he seems extremely comfortable behind a camera."

Accolades

See also
 Cinema of Australia

References

External links 
 

 https://web.archive.org/web/20130424160701/http://www.aquariusfilms.com.au/index.php/about
 https://web.archive.org/web/20130410025818/http://www.aquariusfilms.com.au/index.php/download_file/-/view/16

2007 short films
2007 films
Australian coming-of-age films
Australian drama short films
Films directed by David Michôd
Films set in Australia
Films shot in Sydney
Australian independent films
2000s English-language films